In association football, or soccer, scoring a goal is the only method of scoring. The method of passing the ball to the goalscorer is considered an assist. In  National Collegiate Athletic Association (NCAA) Division I soccer, where a player's career is at most four seasons long, it is considered a notable achievement to reach the 40-assist threshold. In even rarer instances, players have reached the 50 and 60-assist plateaus (no player has ever scored 70 or more goals at the Division I level). The top 25 highest assisters in NCAA Division I men's soccer history are listed below. The NCAA did not split into its current divisions format until August 1973. From 1959 to 1971, there were no classifications to the NCAA nor its predecessor, the Intercollegiate Soccer Football Association (ISFA). Then, from 1972 to 1973, colleges were classified as either "NCAA University Division (Major College)" or "NCAA College Division (Small College)".

Below is a list of the top goal-scorers in NCAA Division I men's soccer history.

Key

List

References

External links 
 NCAA Division I Men's Soccer Record Book

NCAA Division I men's soccer statistical leaders